JSS Medical College (JSSMC) jagadguru sri shivarathreeshwara medical college is a medical college based in Mysore, Karnataka, India. The graduate and post-graduate programs of the college are recognized by the Medical Council of India. The courses offered are also recognized by General Medical Council (UK), Sri Lanka Medical Council and WHO. The college has been recognized by the Royal College of Obstetricians and Gynaecologists, UK, for the award of MRCOG. After the formation of JSS University (Established under Section-3 of UGC Act), JSS Medical College became a constituent college of the JSS University (now JSS Academy of Higher Education and Research-JSSAHER) from the Academic year 2008–2009, which is among the country's top 5 and world's top 500 universities as per The Times Higher Education Ranking, 2019 which also ranked JSSAHER as India's most impactful university. JSS Academy of Higher Education and Research has grabbed the 93rd spot in the Clinical and Health category, in the World University Rankings 2022 by THE (Times Higher Education Rankings) for 1500~ Universities across the globe.  JSS is the only one higher education institute from India has got a top slot, in the top 100, at 93rd position. JSSAHER has been accredited by NAAC with an A+ grade. The students of this college are from all corners of India as well as from abroad.
Attached to one of the biggest hospitals in India, it is one of the first institutions in the country to establish a plastination museum. JSS Body Donation Camp is also one of the biggest body donation camps in India.
It has been ranked as one of the top medical colleges by Careers 360 and Outlook. JSSAHER also has a QS 4 star rating along with Autonomous Status granted by MHRD on recommendations of UGC for maintaining high standards in medical education.

Research
JSS Medical College entered into an institutional collaboration agreement with medical fraternity from University of Cincinnati consisting of physicians and biomedical researchers.
Research is carried out through National and International funded projects. The centre of Excellence in Molecular Biology & Regenerative Medicine has funding from Vision Group of Science & Technology, Department of Science & Technology, Indian Council of Medical Research and UGC. The center is carrying out pioneering research in the field of cancer biology and diabetes mellitus. Depression Brain Bank is in function. JSS Body Donation Association registers and receives donations of bodies.

Library & information centre
The central library is located on the first floor of the main building, which is spread in an area of 3,206 m2. This building is divided into different sections like Reference Section, Periodicals, Computer, Audio-visual Section and General Reading Room.

The hospital library is an extension of the college library and it was established in the year 1997 for the benefit of clinical faculties, post Graduate students and house surgeons. The library has a collection of about 23986 volumes. Added to this the collection includes the back volumes of Periodicals, Videocassettes and 35 mm Slides etc. The collection also comprises Medical Reference Books, Textbooks, Encyclopedias, Dictionaries, Technical Reports, Thesis Works and Dissertation Reports and many other books on General Reading.

Books and CD-ROM databases: 
The library is subscribing for 242 journals (129 foreign, 113 Indian) of medical science that are systematically displayed in the Journal Section.

Ranking 
JSS Medical College was ranked 17th among medical colleges in India in 2019 by the National Institutional Ranking Framework in 2019.In 2020 it was placed on 20th spot by NIRF (HRD MINISTRY)

Undergraduate courses 
The college offers the four and a half year M.B.B.S. course with a one-year compulsory rotating internship. There are 250 seats which are filled through NEET exam.

Postgraduate courses 
The college offers both the post graduate degree and diploma courses. The degree course is 3 years duration whereas the diploma course is 2 years.

Super Specialty Courses
 M.Ch [Urology]
 D.M.[Neurology]
 D.M.[Gastroenterology]
 D.M. [Nephrology]
 PhD [Philosophy]

PG Degree Courses:
 M.S Anatomy
 M.D Physiology
 M.D Biochemistry
 M.D Pharmacology
 M.D Pathology
 M.D Microbiology
 M.D Community Medicine
 M.D Forensic Medicine
 M.D General Medicine
 M.D Radiology
 M.S General Surgery
 M.S OBG
 M.D Paediatrics
 M.D Anaesthesia
 M.S Orthopaedics
 M.S ENT
 M.S Ophthalmology
 M.D.Dermatology
 M.D.[Psychiatry]
 M.D.[TB & Respiratory Medicine]
 M.D.[Emergency Medicine]
 M.D.[Hospital Administration]

PG Diploma Courses:
 DCP  – Pathology
 DGO
 DCH – Paediatrics
 DA
 D.Ortho
 DLO
 DMRD

Smile Trainee Program 
Since March 2002, as a trial 'run', 40 children with clefts of lip and palate have been operated by Dr. Satish H.V., M.S., M.Ch., a consultant plastic surgeon. JSS Hospital offers complete rehabilitation facilities for these children. The JSS Dental College has come up with all the necessary advancements to treat the accompanying dental problems. The JSS Institute of Speech and Hearing offers speech therapy and is conducting research on various aspects of cleft lip and cleft palate disorders.

Body Donation – JSS Body Donation Association 
The association was established in June 1996. Its main purpose is to receive donor bodies for corneal transplantation for the blind, as well as for research purposes and the study of organs by undergraduate, postgraduate and research students.

Sports 
The college has facilities and grounds for cricket, football, table tennis, volleyball, hockey, badminton, athletics, and indoor games, as well as a permanent sports ground on par with national standards and a gym.

Hospital 

The JSS Hospital with 1,800 beds under one roof is one of India's biggest hospitals. It also received NABH accreditation in June 2018. It also has one of the biggest critical and emergency care facilities with 260 beds.

The hospital is a non-profit hospital and is dedicated to serve the poor and downtrodden with affordable healthcare. The new facility is located in an area of 12.5 acres and has a built-up space of 1.25 million sq ft. The hospital provides service in 37 specialities/super specialities and has 55 special clinics. It plans to cater to the healthcare needs of more than 16,000 outpatients in addition to the existing number of 18,000 and 3,500 inpatients every month.

The new facility offers services in Haematology, Biochemistry, Clinical Pathology, Cytology & Histopathology, Microbiology & Serology, Radio diagnosis & Imaging, Immunology, and Immuno-histochemistry.
The present JSS Hospital in Ramanuja Road has a long history. In order to serve the needy and poor sections of the society, Dr.Sri Shivarathri Rajendra Mahaswamiji started J.S.S. Health Centre in 1963 on a small scale. The present hospital has 1800 beds with 37 specialties and super specialties started under the aegis of J.S.S. Medical Service Trust. It now serves as a teaching hospital to the J.S.S. Medical College.

A notable feature of this hospital is that it caters to the needs of the patients of rural parts of the districts viz., Mysore, Chamarajnagar, Mandya, Coorg, and Hassan in Karnataka and the Nilgiri mountains in Tamil Nadu. It treats on average, 800 patients in outpatient department and facilities provided for 1200 in-patients. Several health activities are organized in rural areas to create health awareness.

Apart from extending the clinical facilities to the J.S.S. Medical College, it trains students of J.S.S. Nursing College, Nursing School and JSS College of Physiotherapy, JSS College of Speech & Hearing also.

Facilities

Multi specialty / Higher specialty treatments / Departments 

General Medicine,
General Surgery,
Pathology,                                                        
Obstetrics and Gynaecology,
Pediatrics,
Orthopedics,
Ophthalmology,
ENT,
Dermatology & Venerology,
Psychiatry,
Anaesthesia,
Radiology,
Nephrology,
Neurology,
Urology,
Pulmonology,
Neurosurgery,
Laparoscopic surgery,
Gastroenterology,
Plastic Surgery,
Pediatric Surgery
Physiotherapy
Additional facilities / features:
Physical Medicine and Rehabilitation center
Ayurveda,
Speech and hearing center,
Clinical Psychologist,
clinical pharmacy,
Medico Social Work,
Regional Blood Bank,
Artificial limb Center,
Naturopathy,
Vertigo Clinic,
Headache Clinic,
Head & Neck Cancer Clinic,
Epilepsy Clinic,
Child Guidance Clinic,
Sexual Health Clinic,
Pigmentry Clinic,
Cancer detection Clinic,
Infertility Clinic,
Immunization,
HIV Counseling,
Diabetics,
Hand Surgery

Operation theatre complex 

JSS is equipped with 24 major operation theaters and 3 modular operation theatres in the same premises having conducted 25470 surgeries in 2010 (both Major & Minor).

Multi specialty surgeries

Kidney transplantation and Corneal transplantation are conducted in the hospital. JSS Hospital is the first hospital to conduct Renal Transplantation outside Bangalore in the state of Karnataka.

References 
JSS Medical College – Home
JSS University – Medical College
Medical College.org.in JSS

External links 

 
 JSS Department of Radiology website
 Alumni association

Medical colleges in Karnataka
Medical Council of India
Universities and colleges in Mysore